Plagionotus is a genus of beetle in the family Cerambycidae, distributed primarily in the Old World, with only one species found in the New World, Plagionotus astecus.

References

Clytini